George Burpee Jones (January 9, 1866 – April 27, 1950) was a Canadian merchant and politician.

Biography
Born in Belleisle Bay, New Brunswick, Jones represented King's County in the Legislative Assembly of New Brunswick from 1908 to 1921. He was first elected to the House of Commons of Canada in the riding of Royal in the 1921 federal election. A Conservative, he was re-elected in 1925, 1926, and 1930. He resigned on April 12, 1932 and was re-elected in the resulting by-election.
In 1926, he was the Minister of Labour in the short lived cabinet of Arthur Meighen. He was appointed to the Senate of Canada in 1935 representing the senatorial division of New Brunswick and served until his death in 1950.

Electoral history

References
 

1866 births
1950 deaths
Canadian senators from New Brunswick
Conservative Party of Canada (1867–1942) MPs
Conservative Party of Canada (1867–1942) senators
Members of the House of Commons of Canada from New Brunswick
Progressive Conservative Party of Canada senators
Progressive Conservative Party of New Brunswick MLAs